Martin Boakye (born 10 February 1995) is an Italian professional footballer who plays as a forward for Uzbekistan Super League club in AGMK.

Career
Boakye played for USD Ponte dei Nori and UCD Solesinese in his native Italy before joining Austrian Regionalliga side Kitzbühel in 2016. After three years in Austria, he joined Luxembourg National Division side Jeunesse Esch. On 9 August 2020, it was announced that Boakye had signed for Croatian First Football League side Slaven Belupo. A week later, he made his professional league debut, starting in a 0–0 draw with Osijek. On 4 January 2021, Boakye terminated this contract mutually with Slaven Belupo.

Personal life
Boakye is of Ghanaian origin and the 2nd born of three children, he has an older and a younger sister. Reliable sources report that Boakye has been in a relationship with his childhood love since 2015.

References

External links

1995 births
Italian people of Ghanaian descent
Italian sportspeople of African descent
Living people
Italian footballers
Association football forwards
Jeunesse Esch players
NK Slaven Belupo players
FK Andijon players
FC AGMK players
Austrian Regionalliga players
Luxembourg National Division players
Croatian Football League players
Uzbekistan Super League players
Italian expatriate footballers
Italian expatriate sportspeople in Austria
Expatriate footballers in Austria
Italian expatriate sportspeople in Luxembourg
Expatriate footballers in Luxembourg
Italian expatriate sportspeople in Croatia
Expatriate footballers in Croatia
Italian expatriate sportspeople in Uzbekistan
Expatriate footballers in Uzbekistan